Sa'a can refer to:

 Sa'a, Cameroon, a town in Cameroon
 Sa'a language, of the Solomon Islands